The Honduran Supercup is a Honduran football competition held yearly as a preseason match between the reigning champions of the Liga Nacional and the Honduran Cup.  The competition started unofficially in 1997, but it was discontinued after just two seasons.  In 2015, it was intended to be reactivated, however the match between F.C. Motagua and Club Deportivo Olimpia was scheduled but not played.  One year later, a new Supercup edition was finally reestablished after 17 years of dormancy.  The Honduran football authorities however, did not consider the competition official until 2017.

Winners

Titles by club

Re-launch
In January 2015, the Honduran Secretary of State for Culture, Arts and Sports gathered with the Honduran League to discuss a possible reactivation of the competition in 2016.  An official Super Cup has not been played since 1999.

Other versions
In 2014 and 2016, there were three exhibition versions of the tournament re-branded as Supercopa Diez, sponsored by local daily sports newspaper Diario Deportivo Diez.  These unofficial editions faced the champions of the Liga Nacional against the champions of the Liga de Ascenso.

See also
 Honduran League
 Honduran Cup

References

 
Honduras
Recurring sporting events established in 1997